Chifley is a suburb in the Eastern Suburbs of Sydney, in the state of New South Wales, Australia. Chifley is 13 km south-east of the Sydney central business district and is part of the City of Randwick. The postcode is 2036. Chifley is surrounded by the suburbs of Matraville, Malabar, Little Bay and Phillip Bay.

History
The first house built in the Chifley area was Bunnerong House, which was built in 1825. Most land in that area was owned by the Crown; during the Depression of the 1930s, land was leased to people who built homes in the area gradually, over a drawn-out period of time. Chifley was named after Ben Chifley (1885–1951), Australia's Labor Prime Minister at the end of World War II. Randwick Council made the area, which had been part of southern Matraville, a separate suburb in 1964.

A large public housing complex was established in the area in the 1960s. It featured a number of four- and five-storey buildings, plus some smaller buildings containing bedsit-style accommodation, in which lounge-room and bedroom are combined in one room.

Chifley today

Chifley today is predominantly residential. Its low to medium-density housing has attracted a larger proportion of families with children than many other suburbs in the City of Randwick. In recent years, much of the original housing stock has been demolished and replaced by larger and taller family homes. There are also a number of townhouses which fill up the streets of Chifley.

The suburb contains two schools, Chifley Public School and Matraville Sports High School, and a number of preschool centres. Recreational areas include the Women's Athletic Field and Dr Walters Park.

The western edge of Chifley contains a small remnant of Eastern Suburbs Banksia Scrub, which was once the major flora habitat in this coastal region of Sydney. Efforts are being made to remediate and preserve this area.

A number of notable local points of interest adjoin Chifley, including the Long Bay Correctional Centre, Eastern Suburbs Memorial Park and the Bunnerong Equestrian Park.

Demographics
According to the 2016 census of Population, there were 4,974 people in Chifley.
 Aboriginal and Torres Strait Islander people made up 4.1% of the population.
 The most common ancestries were Australian 20.6%, English 20.2%, Irish 10.4%, Chinese 5.6% and Scottish 4.9%.
 66.0% of people were born in Australia and 70.8% of people only spoke English at home.
 The most common responses for religion were Catholic 35.8%, No Religion 19.3% and Anglican 15.4%.

Schools

 Chifley Public School
 Matraville Sports High School

Parks
 Dr Walters Park on Mawson Parade
 Women's Athletic Field

References

Suburbs of Sydney